Miss Champagne-Ardenne is a French beauty pageant which selects a representative for the Miss France national competition from the region of Champagne-Ardenne. Women representing the region under various different titles have competed at Miss France since 1964, although the Miss Champagne-Ardenne title was not used regularly until 1994.

The current Miss Champagne-Ardenne is Solène Scholer, who was crowned Miss Champagne-Ardenne 2022 on 14 October 2022. No Miss Champagne-Ardenne titleholders have gone on to win Miss France.

Results summary
1st Runner-Up: Gisèle Aupetit (1964; Miss Champagne)
3rd Runner-Up: Safiatou Guinot (2017)
4th Runner-Up: Guilène Nancy (1976; Miss Champagne); Christine Grégoire (1984; Miss Champagne)
Top 12/Top 15: Karine Lenne (1990); Cécile Brandao (2009); Déborah Trichet (2012)

Titleholders

Miss Ardennes
In the 1970s and 1980s, the department of Ardennes crowned its own representative for Miss France.

Miss Aube
In 1978, the department of Aube crowned its own representative for Miss France.

Miss Champagne
In 1964, the 1970s, and the 1980s, the region crowned a representative under the title Miss Champagne. In 1970, the title was called Miss Brie-Champagne.

Miss Pays d'Othe
In 1993, the regions of Champagne-Ardenne and Burgundy crowned a shared representative under the title Miss Pays d'Othe.

Notes

References

External links

Miss France regional pageants
Beauty pageants in France
Women in France